ORP Mewa (Polish for "seagull") was a  of the Polish Navy at the outset of World War II. Mewa participated in the defense of Poland during the German invasion of 1939. The ship was damaged on 1 September 1939 by a German bomb. On 3 September she was again hit by bombs and sank. The ship was later refloated and captured by the Germans. After the war, she returned to serve under the Polish flag.

Jaskółka-class minesweepers
Ships built in Gdynia
Naval ships of Poland captured by Germany during World War II
Ships sunk by German aircraft
Maritime incidents in September 1939
Shipwrecks of Poland
1935 ships
Minesweepers sunk by aircraft